Peter Ernie Nyari (born 7 September 1971) is an Italian former professional baseball player who competed in the 2004 Summer Olympics.

References

1971 births
Living people
Olympic baseball players of Italy
Baseball players at the 2004 Summer Olympics
Aberdeen Arsenal players
Batavia Clippers players
Parma Baseball Club players
Clearwater Phillies players
De Angelis North East Knights players
Lehigh Valley Black Diamonds players
Piedmont Boll Weevils players
Piedmont Phillies players
Reading Phillies players
Sportspeople from Erie, Pennsylvania
Baseball players from Pennsylvania
Edinboro Fighting Scots baseball players
American expatriate baseball players in San Marino
T & A San Marino players